Kurt Frey (11 August 1913 – 19 December 1993) was a German sailor. He competed in the mixed 6 metres at the 1936 Summer Olympics.

Personal life
Frey served in the Kriegsmarine during the Second World War and was taken prisoner by Soviet forces. He became a UNESCO official after his release.

References

1913 births
1993 deaths
Sportspeople from Kiel
Olympic sailors of Germany
Sailors at the 1936 Summer Olympics – 6 Metre
Kriegsmarine personnel of World War II
UNESCO officials
German prisoners of war in World War II held by the Soviet Union
German male sailors (sport)